Chrysallida leoni is a species of sea snail, a marine gastropod mollusk in the family Pyramidellidae, the pyrams and their allies. The species is one of a number within the genus Chrysallida.

Distribution
This marine species occurs in the Caribbean Sea off Cuba.

References

 Fernández-Garcés R., Peñas A. & Rolán E. (2011) A new species of Chrysallida (Pyramidelloidea, Chrysallidae) from Cuba. Gloria Maris 50(3-4): 79-82

External links
 To World Register of Marine Species

leoni
Gastropods described in 2011